Kanthi Lok Sabha constituency (earlier known as Contai Lok Sabha constituency) is one of the 543 parliamentary constituencies in India. The constituency centres on Contai in West Bengal. All the seven assembly segments of No. 31 Kanthi Lok Sabha constituency are in Purba Medinipur district.

Assembly segments

As per order of the Delimitation Commission issued in 2006 in respect of the delimitation of constituencies in the West Bengal, parliamentary constituency no. 31 Kanthi is composed of the following segments:

Prior to delimitation, Contai Lok Sabha constituency was composed of the following assembly segments:Bhagabanpur (assembly constituency no. 208), Khajuri (SC) (assembly constituency no. 209), Contai North (assembly constituency no. 210), Contai South (assembly constituency no. 211), Ramnagar (assembly constituency no. 212), Egra (assembly constituency no. 213) and Mugberia (assembly constituency no. 214)

Members of Parliament

Election results

General election 2019

General election 2014

General election 2009

General election 2004

General elections 1951-2004
Most of the contests were multi-cornered. However, only winners and runners-up are mentioned below:

See also
 Contai
 List of Constituencies of the Lok Sabha

References

External links
Kanthi lok sabha  constituency election 2019 result details

Lok Sabha constituencies in West Bengal
Politics of Purba Medinipur district